ical is a calendar package written in Tcl/Tk by Sanjay Ghemawat for Unix systems.  ical is known for its simple, intuitive interface. It's possible for Tcl/Tk programmers to extend ical with custom functionality. It stores all calendaring information in a single flat text file per user that may be easily parsed by other programs. ical is free software released under the GNU General Public License.

ical is not related to the iCalendar format standard, and does not support it.  It is also not related to Apple Inc.'s calendaring application, Calendar (which was previously called iCal).

External links 
 
 ical development project

See also 
List of personal information managers

Free calendaring software
Free software programmed in Tcl
Software that uses Tk (software)